The National Equal Rights Party was a United States minor party during the late 19th century that supported women's rights. The presidential candidates from this party were Victoria Woodhull in 1872 and Belva Ann Lockwood in 1884 and 1888. They are generally considered to be the first women to run for president in the US. Some historians suggest that they should not be considered true candidates, as women could not vote in federal and most state elections at the time. Nettie Sanford Chapin served as chair of its National Committee.

References 

Defunct political parties in the United States
Women's rights organizations